The 785th Military Police Battalion (I/R) is an Army Reserve unit whose mission is to provide command, planning, administration, and logistical support for the operation of an internment/resettlement facility. It is located in Fraser, Michigan.

Battalion lineage 
This information provided by the Army Institute of Heraldry.
Constituted 12 November 1942 in the Army of the United States as the 785th Military Police Battalion
Activated 28 November 1942 at Fort Custer, Michigan
Inactivated 10 December 1946 on Okinawa
Redesignated 12 February 1948 as the 300th Military Police Battalion and allotted to the Organized Reserves
Activated 25 February 1948 with headquarters at Chicago, Illinois
 (Organized Reserves redesignated 25 March 1948 as the Organized Reserve Corps; redesignated 9 July 1952 as the Army Reserve)
Inactivated 30 March 1951 at Chicago, Illinois
Redesignated 24 June 1953 as the 785th Military Police Battalion
Headquarters and Headquarters Detachment activated 16 December 1991 at Inkster, Michigan

Campaign participation credit and honors
World War II
Rhineland
Central Europe
Asiatic-Pacific Theater, Streamer without inscription
Operation Enduring Freedom (Guantánamo Bay, Cuba) 2002–2003
Joint Meritorious Unit Award (Army) 2002–2003
Operation Iraqi Freedom (Camp Bucca) 2005–2006
Meritorious Unit Commendation (Army) 2005–2006
Operation Enduring Freedom (Camp Sabalu-Harrison) 2011–2012

Heraldic items

Coat of Arms

Blazon
Shield: Vert, a double-headed battle-axe Or blades Sable fimbriated of the second, surmounted by two swords saltirewise of the like.
Crest: That for regiments and separate battalions of the Army Reserve: On a wreath of the colors, Or and Vert, the Lexington Minute Man Proper.The Statue of the Minute Man, Captain John Parker (H.H. Kitson, sculptor), stands on the Common in Lexington, Massachusetts.
Motto: SAFEGUARD AND SECURE.

Symbolism 
Shield:
Green and yellow (gold) are the colors traditionally associated with the Military Police Corps.
The battle-axe is a symbol of authority and emphasizes the mission of the Battalion in both peace and war.
The swords represent military readiness and commemorate the unit's two campaigns in World War II.
Black denotes determination and dependability; gold is for honor and excellence.
Crest: The crest is that of the U.S. Army Reserve.
Background: The coat of arms was approved on 1992-07-27.

Distinctive Unit Insignia
Description: A gold color metal and enamel device  in height overall, consisting of a gold demi-battle-axe with two black blades superimposed by two diagonally crossed gold swords, overall in base two wavy green scrolls, one above the other with the top scroll inscribed "SAFEGUARD" and the bottom scroll inscribed "AND SECURE" in gold letters.
Symbolism:
Green and yellow (gold) are the colors traditionally associated with the Military Police Corps.
The battle-axe is a symbol of authority and emphasizes the mission of the Battalion in both peace and war.
The swords represent military readiness and commemorate the unit's two campaigns in World War II.
Black denotes determination and dependability; gold is for honor and excellence.

Background: The distinctive unit insignia was approved on 1992-07-02.

External links (and references)

 1 – Lineage And Honors Information
 2 – HRC Permanent Order 031-09 dtd 31 January 2007
 Distinctive Unit Insignia information at Army Heraldry

785